La Grenouille is a historic and award-winning French restaurant located at 3 East 52nd Street between Fifth Avenue and Madison Avenue in Midtown Manhattan, New York City. Founded in 1962 by former Henri Soulé apprentice Charles Masson Sr. and his wife Gisèle, later with sons Philippe and Charles, La Grenouille (French for "The Frog") became a location of choice among New York, U.S., and eventually international diners, including designers from the nearby Garment District of Manhattan. It is the last operating New York French haute cuisine restaurant from the 1960s, and remains a highly rated restaurant.

History
The restaurant was founded in 1962 by Charles Masson Sr., a former Henri Soulé apprentice, and his wife Gisèle.  After the passing of Charles Sr. in 1975, Gisele continued to manage the restaurant until 2010. Charles Jr. assisted Gisele with her management duties from 1975 until 1994, when Charles Jr. left the restaurant.  At that time, Gisele’s younger son Philippe took over Charles Jr.’s duties until 2000, whereupon Charles Jr. returned and assisted Gisele until 2014.  La Grenouille is currently operated by Philippe Masson, and has been since 2014. It is the last operating New York French haute cuisine restaurant from the 1960s,  having outlasted other well-known French restaurants like Lutèce, which closed in 2004.

Menu

The menu of La Grenouille is essentially entirely "haute French cuisine," with customer menus presenting the French names of classic and more modern dishes, followed by the English, and an English description.

Renown
Aside from its haute French cuisine, La Grenouille is notable for its clientele, and is considered a location of choice among New York, U.S., and international diners. A segment of this clientele includes designers from the nearby New York fashion district; it has been spoken of as a hotspot for its notables, e.g. Elle magazine creative director Joe Zee.

In addition, the restaurant is famous for its lavish floral arrangements, a tradition started by Charles Masson Sr. and continued by his son  Philippe Masson, and reflected in a decor ranking that places it in the top tier of New York Restaurants.

In 1972 W magazine referred to it one of "Les Six, the last bastions of grand luxe dining in New York." The other five were Lutèce, La Caravelle, La Côte Basque, Lafayette, and Quo Vadis. La Grenouille is the last operating New York French haute cuisine restaurant from the 1960s, a time when it dominated New York City's French haute cuisine.

In 2012, the restaurant won the James Beard Foundation Award for Outstanding Service.

References

Further reading

External links
 

Restaurants in Manhattan
Restaurants established in 1962
French-American culture in New York City
French restaurants in New York City
Midtown Manhattan
James Beard Foundation Award winners
1962 establishments in New York City
Fine dining